Andrew K. Ludwick is a co-founder of SynOptics and was the CEO and President of SynOptics Communications and CEO and President of Bay Networks from 1985-1996.

Before founding SynOptics in 1985, Ludwick worked as an executive assistant at Xerox Corporation. Within Xerox, he teamed up with Xerox PARC researcher Ronald V. Schmidt to promote the idea of commercializing Schmidt's invention of a fiber optic version of the ethernet computer networking system. Although they were rebuffed in their goal of turning this system into a Xerox product, Xerox instead allowed Ludwick and Schmidt to spin it off into a separate company (with equity held by Xerox in exchange for their intellectual property). The company, initially named Astra Communications, eventually became SynOptics.

References

American technology chief executives
Living people
Year of birth missing (living people)